Surfin' with Bo Diddley is the tenth studio album by American musician Bo Diddley released on the Checker label in 1963 .

Reception

AllMusic reviewer Bruce Eder stated "This is where Bo -- or, more properly, Chess Records -- really took a wrong step, starting with the fact that The Originator himself is actually on only about half of the cuts here, the balance having been recorded by guitarist Billy Lee Riley. The idea wasn't as bad as it sounded, at least on paper -- Bo had been an indirect influence on tons of surf bands, with his signature grunge guitar-sound, but the surf music world wasn't ready for a Bo-style instrumental rendition of the Jerome Kern/Oscar Hammerstein II Showboat standard "Ol' Man River," ... The best tracks are "Cookie Headed Diddley" and "Surf, Sink or Swim," which come close to matching some of Bo's solid material from earlier albums and singles".

Track listing 
All tracks credited to  except where noted
 "What Did I Say" (Ray Charles) – 2:13
 "White Silver Sands" (Charles 'Red' Matthews, Gladys Reinhart) – 2:48
 "Surfboard Cha Cha" (Billy Lee Riley) – 2:12
 "Surf, Sink or Swim" (Ellas McDaniel) – 3:20
 "Piggy Back Surfers" (Riley) – 2:11
 "Surfers Love Call" (McDaniel) – 2:50
 "Twisting Waves" (Martin Willis) – 1:45
 "Wishy Washy" (Riley) – 2:21
 "Hucklebuck" (Paul Williams) – 2:08
 "Old Man River" (Jerome Kern, Oscar Hammerstein II arranged by Bo Diddley) – 2:22
 "Oop's He Slipped" (Riley) – 1:57
 "Low Tide" (McDaniel) – 2:05

Personnel

Tracks 4, 6, 10 & 12
Bo Diddley – vocals, guitar
Other musicians unidentified but possibly include:
Norma-Jean Wofford – guitar, background vocals
Jerome Green – maracas, backing vocals

Tracks 1-3, 5, 7-9 & 11
Bill Riley – guitar
Jimmy Wilson – piano
Martin Willis – saxophone
Unidentified – bass, drums

References 

1963 albums
Bo Diddley albums
Checker Records albums